War and Peace is a British television dramatisation of the 1869 Leo Tolstoy novel War and Peace. This 20-episode series began on 28 September 1972. The BBC dramatisation of Tolstoy's epic story of love and loss set against the backdrop of the Napoleonic Wars. Anthony Hopkins heads the cast as Pierre Bezukhov, Morag Hood is Natasha Rostova, Alan Dobie is Andrei Bolkonsky and David Swift is Napoleon, whose decision to invade Russia in 1812 has far-reaching consequences for each of them and their families.

The twenty-part serial was produced by David Conroy and directed by John Davies. Conroy's aim was to transfer the characters and plot from Tolstoy's novel to television drama to run for a duration of 15 hours. Scripted by Jack Pulman, this version of War and Peace contained battle sequences, which were filmed in Yugoslavia. The theme tune is the Russian imperial anthem, played by the band of the Welsh Guards.

Hopkins received the British Academy Television Award for Best Actor for his performance, and the production designer Don Homfray won a BAFTA for his work on the series.

Production

War and Peace followed the success of such literary adaptations as The Forsyte Saga (BBC2, 1967).

Charlie Knode designed the costumes.

The production took three years (1969–72) and involved location filming in SR Serbia and at English stately homes. Soldiers of the Yugoslav Territorial Defense appeared as extras in battle scenes.

Cast

Anthony Hopkins as Pierre Bezukhov
Alan Dobie as Andrei Nikolayevich Bolkonsky
Morag Hood as Natasha Rostova
Angela Down as Maria Bolkonskaya
Rupert Davies as Count Ilya Rostov
Faith Brook as Countess Natalie Rostova
David Swift as Napoleon Bonaparte
Frank Middlemass as Mikhail Kutuzov
Sylvester Morand as Nikolai Rostov
Joanna David as Sonya
Harry Locke as Platon Karataev
Donald Douglas as Tsar Alexander I of Russia
John Cazabon as Barclay de Tolly
Fiona Gaunt as Hélène Kuragina, wife of Pierre Bezukhov
Anthony Jacobs as Prince Nikolay Bolkonsky, father of Andrei and Marya
Athene Fielding as Mademoiselle Bourienne, companion to Marya
Barnaby Shaw and Rufus Frampton as Petya Rostov
Peter Bathurst as Pfuhl
Morris Perry as Joseph Fouché
Geoffrey Morris as Napoleon's secretary
Michael Gover as General Balashev
Toby Bridge as young Nikolenka Bolkonsky
Neil Stacy as Boris Drubetskoy
Anne Blake as Princess Drubetskoya
Gary Watson as Denisov
Donald Burton as Dolokhov
Tony Steedman as Marshal Davout
Joseph Wise as Russian officer
Colin Baker as Anatole Kuragin
Basil Henson as Prince Vasili Kuragin
Josie Kidd as Katishe
James Appleby as German adjutant
Gerard Hely as Prince Murat
Michael Billington as Lt. Berg
Will Leighton as Tikhon
Patricia Shakesby as Vera Rostova, married to Berg
Alison Frazer as Princess Lisa Bolkonskya
Colin Fisher as Telyanin
John Breslin as Marshal Berthier
Pat Gorman as French Sergeant
Philip Lowrie as French Captain
Edmund Bailey as Prokofy
Hugh Cross as Mitenka
Richard Poore as French messenger
Barbara Young as Anna Scherer
Karin MacCarthy as Julie Karagin
Maurice Quick as Pavel
Roy Spencer as Timohin
Hubert Cross as General Rapp
Geoffrey Denton as Host
Tenniel Evans as Prince Bagration
Gordon Faith as Galitsyn
John Lawrence as Anna's guest
Judith Pollard as Olga
Edith Sharpe as Madame Scherer
Tony Caunter as French Corporal
Erik Chitty as Gerasim

Episodes

Reception
According to Dr. Lez Cooke in British Television Drama: A History (2003), War and Peace consolidated BBC2 as the channel responsible for 'quality' literary drama.

In The New Yorker in 2016, Louis Menand wrote, "It drags in parts today, but in 1972 no one had seen television that grand or ambitious before. The length—almost fifteen hours—meant the series could include scenes, like the wolf hunt, or Denisov dancing the mazurka, that are dramatically superfluous but thematically vital. The acting is inspired, in part because the casting was inspired, from Anthony Hopkins, as Pierre, to David Swift, as a pint-sized, swaggering Napoleon. Everyone looks just the way he or she's supposed to look."

Clive James criticised some performances: "I was cruel to Morag Hood when I said that her performance made me want to throw a tarpauline over her and peg down the corners. I should have blamed the director, who had obviously told her to bounce up and down at all times in order to convey exuberance. [...] In that same production, Alan Dobie as Andrei was grim enough to send you to sleep, but Anthony Hopkins was a perfect Pierre: a real tribute to his acting, because his default mode is to be in command."

Paul Mavis (DVD Talk) awarded it 4 stars, saying, "It positively luxuriates in its expansive format, giving the viewer a remarkable chance to fully experience the various nuances of character and the myriad permutations of shifting relationships (as well as Tolstoy's numerous plot coincidences) that mark this mammoth work." He praised Alan Dobie as "uniformed in Byronic splendor [...] spot-on as the dour, heroic, closed-off Andrei Bolkonsky", also praising Angela Down (Maria) and Sylvester Morand (Nikolai). However, he criticised Hood's performance, saying, "the casting of Morag Hood (which, according to the production history included in this DVD set, was a desperate, last-minute decision) is a distressing misfire. [...] poor Hood can't begin to approach the character with even a modicum of believability. Natasha begins the story as a wild, impetuous girl of thirteen - an age and a temperament that Hood evidently felt needed to be delineated by having Natasha laugh insanely at everything while leaping about like a mad thing (Hood is also far too old to be a believable 13-year-old). As for later maturing into this bewitching, erotic little beauty whom all men adore, either an actress has that innate, inexplicable quality or they don't - you can't 'act' that powerful allure onto the screen. It has to come from within, and simply put, Hood doesn't have it."

Andrew D. Kaufman, in his book Give War and Peace a Chance: Tolstoyan Wisdom for Troubled Times said that this version had "much to recommend", although he preferred the 1966–67 Soviet film. James Monaco called it "easily the best adaptation [...] in any medium" in How to Read a Film: The World of Movies, Media, Multimedia: Language, History, Theory (1977).

DVD release

The series was released in a Region 2 4-DVD boxset by DD Home Entertainment in 2005. The set is accompanied by an illustrated booklet, written by Andy Priestner, which provides a detailed account of how the series was made. In 2009 Simply Home Entertainment released a 5-disc edition with 200 production stills.

See also
War and Peace (1956 film), version directed by King Vidor
War and Peace (1966–67 film), Soviet-produced version, directed by Sergei Bondarchuk
War & Peace (2016 TV series)

References

External links
 
  List of War and Peace episodes at BBC Programmes

1970s British drama television series
1972 British television series debuts
1973 British television series endings
BBC television dramas
Films based on War and Peace
Television series set in the 1800s
Television series set in the 1810s
Television shows filmed in Serbia